Elliot Page is a Canadian actor who has received 76 award nominations for roles across Canadian and American film and television, winning 31 of them. Prior to coming out as transgender in December 2020, Page was nominated in female awards categories under the name Ellen Page. He is most acclaimed for his breakthrough performance at the age of 20 as the eponymous character Juno MacGaff in Juno (2007), an independent coming-of-age film about an unplanned teenage pregnancy. For Juno, he received numerous accolades in Best Breakthrough Performance and Best Actress categories, winning three Teen Choice Awards, a Canadian Comedy Award and a Satellite Award, and earning nominations for two British Academy Film Awards (BAFTAs), an Academy Award (Oscar), a Golden Globe Award, and a Screen Actors Guild Award (SAG). At age 20, he became the fourth-youngest Academy Award Best Actress nominee at the time.

Page's first nominations were for Pit Pony (1999–2000), a Canadian children's television series about a mining town. It was an adaptation of the 1997 television film of the same name—Page's debut role at the age of 10. In 2002, he starred in the feature film Marion Bridge, describing it in 2010 as the role where he "really fell in love with acting". Page continued to receive accolades in film and television as a teenager, with credits including Ghost Cat (2003), ReGenesis (2004) and Wilby Wonderful (2004). He received multiple awards and critical acclaim for Hard Candy (2005), a low-budget thriller film in which he played the lead role of a teenage girl who tortures a pedophile.

Page has also received accolades for roles including the drama films The Tracey Fragments (2007) and Freeheld (2015) and the superhero works X-Men: Days of Future Past (2014) and The Umbrella Academy (2019–). The television documentary series Gaycation (2016), hosted by Page and Ian Daniel, received two Primetime Emmy Award nominations. In Inception, Page won an MTV Movie Award for his leading role as a graduate architecture student. He served as a voice actor in the video game Beyond: Two Souls in 2013, garnering three award nominations.

Awards and nominations

Notes

References

External links
 

Page, Elliot